Bhagvatsinhji  (24 October 1865 – 9 March 1944) was the ruling Maharaja of the princely state of Gondal from 1869 till his death in 1944, upon which he was honoured with 11-gun salute. He was the only Maharaja to take a medical degree and other degrees.

Early life
Bhagvatsingh was born as Kumar Sri Bhagvatsinghji Sangramsinhji Sahib, Yuvaraja Sahib of Gondal, on 24 October 1865 at Dhoraji, the third and the youngest but only surviving son of Thakurani Bai Shri Monghiba Sahiba, daughter of Jhala Shri Rartansinhji Sahib of Minapur, the third wife of Thakore Sagramji II, the Thakore Sahib, or chieftain, of Gondal, a small princely state that was an offshoot of the great Jadeja dynasty.

Background
The Gondal branch of the dynasty had split off from the dynasty ruling Rajkot in the early 17th century. During the reign of Sagramji II, modern schools, courts and police force were established. In 1869, Sagramji II died, and Bhagvatsingh succeeded his father at the age of four.

Education and training

Bhagvatsingh was educated at The Rajkumar College, Rajkot. He then studied medicine at the University of Edinburgh from 1892, where he graduated as a medical doctor in 1895 and became a Fellow of the Royal College of Physicians of Edinburgh, the only princely ruler ever to do so. In 1894, he became the President of the Organising Committee of the 8th International Congress of Hygiene and Demography at Budapest. He later rose to become vice-president of the Indian Medical Association.

In 1900 he was elected a Fellow of the Royal Society of Edinburgh. His proposers were Sir William Turner, Douglas Argyll Robertson, Alexander Crum Brown and Peter Guthrie Tait.

Reign
Bhagvatsingh reformed the state administration, developed its resources, erected schools, colleges and hospitals, provided free and compulsory education for both men and women through university, built technical schools for engineers and training facilities for labourers. As well, Bhagvatsingh improved the regional livestock through modern animal husbandry, built dams and irrigation networks and introduced sewage, plumbing, rail systems, telegraphs, telephone cables and electricity, becoming also a champion for women's rights. Compulsory education for girls up to fourth grade was enforced; educated mother will raise the next generation for the betterment of the society.  Bhagvatsingh also published the first ever dictionary of Gujarati and a Gujarati encyclopedia, the "Bhagavadgomandal" in 1928.

Bhagvatsingh's four surviving sons were all educated abroad. The eldest son, Bhojirajsingh, studied at Eton School and Balliol College, Oxford, where he took an engineering degree.  His second, Bhupatsingh, was educated at Harrow School and at Trinity College, Cambridge and became a doctor like his father, going on to the London School of Hygiene and Tropical Medicine at the University of London to become a Doctor of Tropical Medicine, Member of the Royal College of Physicians and LRCP. After returning to Gondal, Bhupatsingh became its chief medical officer. The youngest two sons, Kiritsingh and Natwarsingh, were both educated at the University of Edinburgh, and became directors of the state railways.

Only four years after his formal accession in 1888, Gondal was raised to the rank of a first-class state with an 11-gun salute; in 1887, Bhagvatsingh became "Sir Bhagvatsingh" after he was knighted that year.

Family

On 3 June 1881, Bhagvatsingh married Maharani Shri Nand Kunverbaiji Sahiba, CI (1867-9 March 1936). The couple had six sons and three daughters:

Yuvraj Sahib Bhojirajsinhji Bhagvatsinhji (8 January 1883 – 31 July 1952, r. 1944–1952), who succeeded as Maharaja of Gondal
Maharajkumari Bai Shri Nanba Kunverba Sahiba (1884–?)
Rajkumar Shri Ajitsinhji Bhagvatsinghji Sahib (January–May 1887)
Rajkumar Shri Ranjitsinhji Bhagvatsinghji Sahib (16 September 1887 – 1890)
Maharajkumar Shri Dr. Bhupatsinhji Bhagvatsinghji Sahib, LRCP, MRCS, DTM (25 May 1888 – 1945?)
Maharajkumari Bai Shri Leilaba Kunverba Sahiba, later the Rani of Jubbal (14 February 1891 – 7 March 1975); had issue.
Maharajkumar Shri Kiritsinhji Bhagvatsinghji Sahib (13 February 1894–?)
Maharajkumar Shri Natwarsinhji Bhagvatsinghji Sahib (29 May 1895 – 28 October 1937) (mauled by an Asiatic lion at Junagadh)
Maharajkumari Bai Shri Taraba Kunverba Sahiba (4 March 1900 – 1958)

(Although Bhagvatsingh married three other wives, they do not seem to have provided him with children)

Later years
During his reign, Bhagvatsingh abolished all rates, taxes, customs, octroi, and export duties in the state making Gondal the only state to be tax-free. He not just removed the purdah system for women, but 'Zananas' or restricted women's wing were no longer built in subsequent palaces.

By 1918, Gondal was the only state in the Western India States Agency to have compulsory education for girls in all villages In October 1934, on the 50th anniversary of his accession to the throne he gave his weight in gold to charity. Bhagvatsingh died on 9 March 1944 in his eightieth year after a 75-year reign, cementing his reputation as one of the most progressive monarchs in Indian history.

Titles

1865–1869: Kumar Shri Bhagvatsingh Sangramsinhji Sahib, Yuvaraja Sahib of Gondal
1869–1877: His Highness Thakore Shri Bhagvatsingh Sahib, Thakore Sahib of Gondal
1877–1887: His Highness Thakore Shri Bhagvatsingh Sahib, Thakore Sahib of Gondal
1887–1888: His Highness Thakore Shri Sir Bhagvatsingh Sahib, Thakore Sahib of Gondal, KCIE
1888–1892: His Highness Maharaja Thakore Shri Sir Bhagvatsingh Sahib, Maharaja Thakore Sahib of Gondal, KCIE
1892–1895: His Highness Maharaja Thakore Shri Sir Bhagvatsingh Sahib, Maharaja Thakore Sahib of Gondal, KCIE, MRCPE
1895–1897: His Highness Maharaja Thakore Shri Sir Bhagvatsingh Sahib, Maharaja Thakore Sahib of Gondal, KCIE, FRCPE, MRAS, MRI
1897–1909: His Highness Maharaja Thakore Shri Sir Bhagvatsingh Sahib, Maharaja Thakore Sahib of Gondal, GCIE, FRCPE, MRAS, MRI
1909–1913: His Highness Maharaja Thakore Shri Sir Bhagvatsingh Sahib, Maharaja Thakore Sahib of Gondal, GCIE, FRSE, FRCPE, MRAS, MRI, HPAC
1913–1937: His Highness Maharaja Thakore Shri Sir Bhagvatsingh Sahib, Maharaja Thakore Sahib of Gondal, GCIE, FRSE, FRCPE, FCP (Bombay), MRAS, MRI, HPAC
1937–1944: His Highness Maharaja Thakore Shri Sir Bhagvatsingh Sahib, Maharaja Thakore Sahib of Gondal, GCSI, GCIE, FRSE, FRCPE, FCP (Bombay), MRAS, MRI, HPAC

Honours
Bhagvatsingh received numerous honours, both academic and political, through his reign. Here is a full list of his honours and academic degrees:

Academic degrees
Bachelor of Medicine (Edin.) (MB)-1889
Master of Surgery (Edin.) (CM)-1892
Medical Doctor (Edin.) (MD)-1895

Honours

Decorations
 Knight Grand Commander of the Order of the Indian Empire (GCIE)-1897 (KCIE-1887)
 Knight Grand Commander of the Order of the Star of India (GCSI)-1937

Medals
 Prince of Wales Gold Medal-1875
 Empress of India Gold Medal-1877
 Queen Victoria Golden Jubilee Medal-1887
 Delhi Durbar Gold Medal-1903
 Delhi Durbar Gold Medal-1911
 King George V Coronation Medal-1911
 King George V Silver Jubilee Medal-1935
 King George VI Coronation Medal-1937

Honorary degrees
 Fellow of Bombay University-1885
 Honorary LLD (Edin.)-1887
 Honorary DCL (Oxon.)-1892
 Honorary LL.D. Trinity College Dublin – 1900
 Honorary Master of Surgery (SB-Bombay)-1913

Academic societies
 Fellow of the Royal College of Physicians of Edinburgh (FRCPE)-1895 (MRCPE-1892)
 Member of the Royal Asiatic Society (MRAS)
 Member of the Royal Institution of Great Britain and Ireland (MRI)
 Fellow of the Royal Society of Edinburgh (FRSE)-1909
 Fellow of the College of Physicians (FCP-Bombay)-1913

Works
 A Short history of Aryan Medical Science, by the Thakur Sahib of Gondal, 1896.
 Bhagavadgomandal, 1928.

External links
 Perspectives of The Maharaja by the current generation
 Princes, diwans and merchants by Bhalodia-Dhanani, Aarti – University of Texas – Austin : education and reform in colonial India --Depiction of Gondal as one of the illustrative kingdom

References

 Shree Bhagvat Sinhjee: The Maker of Modern Gondal, by St. Nihal Singh, Shree Bhagavat Sinhjee Golden Jubilee Committee, Gondal. Published by Golden Jubilee Committee, 1934.
 Gondal Gealogy at Queensland University.

1865 births
1944 deaths
People from Rajkot district
20th-century Indian medical doctors
Gondal, Bhagvatsingh
Knights Grand Commander of the Order of the Star of India
Knights Grand Commander of the Order of the Indian Empire
Indian knights
Fellows of the Royal Society of Edinburgh
Fellows of the Royal College of Physicians
Alumni of the University of Edinburgh
Gujarati-language writers
Gujarati people
19th-century Indian medical doctors
19th-century Indian non-fiction writers
20th-century Indian non-fiction writers
Indian medical writers
Indian male writers
Medical doctors from Gujarat
Writers from Gujarat
19th-century British male writers